Rough Waters is a 1930 American pre-Code all-talking adventure drama film that directed by John Daumery and starring Rin Tin Tin. The film was adapted by James A. Starr from a story by Lillie Hayward, and was the last Rin Tin Tin film produced by Warner Bros.

Plot
The film begins with a parked car with drawn curtains inside of which three gangsters (played by Walter Miller, Richard Alexander and Skeets Noyes) and silently waiting for their prey. When a large closed vehicle approaches the car with gangsters it crashes and the gangsters quickly rush to the vehicle, kill the chauffeur and two guards and steal a satchel with 100,000 dollars.

The gangsters then look for a hideout and find a fishing hut. This hut is the home of Capt. Thomas (Breese), who can no longer walk and is confined to a wheelchair, and his young daughter Mary (Ralston). Mary is in love with Cal Morton (Chandler), who is a policeman that rides a motorcycle. Morton is Rin Tin Tin's owner. Masquerading as government agents, the gangsters break into the hut and prevent Capt. Thomas and Mary from leaving.

When Rin Tin Tin delivers the daily newspaper, as usual, Mary manages to place a note on Rin Tin Tin for Cal Morton. When Cal arrives with Rin Tin Tin, he and his dog are wounded by one of the gangsters. The gangsters also capture two mail agents (William Irving and George Rigon). The gangsters then attempt to make a getaway by using a boat. In spite of being injured, Rin Tin Tin manages to prevent the escape of the gangsters and delivers them to Cal who handcuffs them with Bill's help.

Cast
Rin Tin Tin as Rinty
Lane Chandler as Cal Morton
Jobyna Ralston as Mary
Edmund Breese as Captain Thomas
Walter Miller as Morris
William Irving as Bill
George Rigon as Fred
Richard Alexander as Little
Skeets Noyes as Davis

Box office
According to Warner Bros the film earned $95,000 domestically and $34,000 foreign.

Preservation status
Rough Waters is now considered to be a lost film. No copies are known to exist.

See also
List of lost films

References

External links
 
 

1930 films
1930s adventure drama films
Warner Bros. films
Lost American films
American black-and-white films
American adventure drama films
Rin Tin Tin
1930 drama films
1930s English-language films
1930s American films